Jack Ferguson (1924–2002) was an Australian politician.

Jack Ferguson may also refer to:
Jack Ferguson (footballer) (1901–1966), Australian rules footballer who played with South Melbourne 
Jack Ferguson (golfer), Scottish golfer
Jack Ferguson (water polo) (1922–1994), Australian water polo player
Jack Ferguson Award, awarded each year to the top draft pick in the Ontario Hockey League Priority Selection Draft
Jack Ferguson, a fictional character in The Adventure of the Sussex Vampire, a 1924 Sherlock Holmes story by Sir Arthur Conan Doyle

See also
John Ferguson (disambiguation)